Martin Jiránek (born 25 May 1979 in Prague) is a former Czech international footballer. A defender, Jiránek played in the top division of several countries.

Jiránek played in a number of international tournaments for his country. In 2002, he was part of the Czech under 21 side which won the 2002 UEFA European Under-21 Football Championship in Switzerland. He subsequently travelled with the senior international squad for the Euro 2004 and 2006 World Cup tournaments.

Career

Club

Early career
Jiránek started his professional career in 1997 for Bohemians Prague, making 55 appearances, before leaving for Slovan Liberec in 1999. He made 32 appearances, and helped Slovan to win the Czech Cup in the 1999/2000 season.

Reggina
In 2001, Jiranek moved to Italian Serie B side Reggina. In his time at Reggina, Jiranek would make 100 league appearances, helping Reggina gain promotion to Serie A in the 2001/02 season.

Spartak Moscow
Spartak Moscow signed Jiránek in 2004 for €4.7m from Reggina. Jiránek made his debut against FC Lokomotiv Moscow. Jiránek was a regular in the starting line-up for six years. Jiránek was the captain of the team in 2009–2010.

Birmingham City
On 31 August 2010, he moved to English Premier League club Birmingham City, signing a one-year deal, having rejected offers from a variety of clubs. Jiránek made his debut in the starting eleven for the League Cup third-round match against MK Dons, and had a good chance to score as Birmingham won 3–1. His second start came in a tidy performance as several first-team regulars were rested for the FA Cup third round tie against Millwall which Birmingham won 4–1. After Scott Dann was injured in the first leg of the League Cup semi-final against West Ham United, Jiránek became a regular starter, and he was in the starting eleven as Birmingham beat favourites Arsenal 2–1 in the League Cup Final at Wembley Stadium. A toe injury that eventually required surgery disrupted the latter part of his season, and following Birmingham's relegation from the Premier League, he rejected the option of another season with the club.

Terek Grozny
In July 2011, Jiránek signed a two-year contract with Russian Premier League club Terek Grozny. In his second season with the club he scored a goal from 45 yards in the league game against Kuban Krasnodar.

International
Jiránek was part of the Czech side which won the UEFA U-21 Championships in 2002. He made his senior international debut against Poland in 2002. Jiránek's first major international tournament came at Euro 2004, where he made 4 appearances before being ruled out of the semi-final with a thigh injury. He also was named in the Czech squad for the 2006 World Cup, but despite playing 5 qualifying matches, he did not make an appearance at the finals. He appeared in 5 qualifying matches for Euro 2008, but was not named in the Czech squad due to an ankle injury. His 31st (and as of February 2011, last) appearance was in March 2007, against Germany - after which, he was fined for his involvement in a controversial birthday party.

Career statistics

Club

International

Statistics accurate as of match played 28 March 2007

Honours
Slovan Liberec
 Czech Cup: 1999–2000

Birmingham City
 Football League Cup: 2010–11

References

External links 

 

1979 births
Living people
Footballers from Prague
Association football defenders
Czech footballers
Czech Republic under-21 international footballers
Czech Republic international footballers
UEFA Euro 2004 players
2006 FIFA World Cup players
Bohemians 1905 players
FC Slovan Liberec players
Reggina 1914 players
FC Spartak Moscow players
Birmingham City F.C. players
Czech First League players
Serie A players
Serie B players
Russian Premier League players
Premier League players
Czech expatriate footballers
Expatriate footballers in Italy
Expatriate footballers in Russia
Expatriate footballers in England
FC Akhmat Grozny players
FC Tom Tomsk players
1. FK Příbram players
FK Dukla Prague players